William H. Rogers Jr. (born 1957/58) is an American businessman, who is the chairman and chief executive officer of Truist Financial Corporation.
Prior to that he was chairman and chief executive officer of Atlanta-based SunTrust Banks, Inc. In December 2019, Charlotte-based Truist was created through a merger of equals between SunTrust and Winston-Salem-based BB&T. Truist is currently the sixth largest U.S. bank and the merger is the biggest bank deal since the financial crisis of 2007-2008. Rogers became president and chief operating officer of Truist after the merger, and he became CEO in September 2021.

Early life
Rogers was raised in Durham, North Carolina.
He received a bachelor's degree in business administration from the University of North Carolina at Chapel Hill and an MBA from Georgia State University.

Career
Rogers started his career at the Trust Company of Georgia, which later merged with SunBanks, Inc. of Florida in 1985 to form SunTrust Banks. He was corporate executive vice president, and later chief operating officer. He was president since December 2008, CEO since June 2011, and chairman since January 2012, replacing James M. Wells, III.  Rogers became president and chief operating officer of Truist in December 2019, and will become CEO in September 2021.

Other positions
Rogers is a board member of the Boys & Girls Clubs of America, Operation HOPE, and the Bank Policy Institute.  He also serves as a member of Emory University's board of trustees.

References

External links

Bill Rogers profile at Bloomberg

Living people
Year of birth missing (living people)
Businesspeople from Atlanta
UNC Kenan–Flagler Business School alumni
Georgia State University alumni
American bankers
Federal Reserve Bank people
SunTrust Banks people
1950s births